Ferdia or Ferdiad is a warrior in Irish mythology.
Ferdia may also refer to:
LÉ Ferdia (A16), ship in the Irish Naval Service
Ferdia Walsh-Peelo, singer and actor